Paulette Laurent (8 March 1926 – 10 December 2018) was a French athlete. She competed in the women's shot put at the 1948 Summer Olympics, where she finished in 10th place.

Laurent was born at Schiltigheim and was a member of the RC Strasbourg athletics club. She became French national champion in the women's discus in 1953, with a throw of 37.51 metres, at the Stade Yves-du-Manoir, Colombes.

References

External links
 

1926 births
2018 deaths
Athletes (track and field) at the 1948 Summer Olympics
French female discus throwers
French female shot putters
Olympic athletes of France
People from Schiltigheim
Sportspeople from Bas-Rhin
20th-century French women